Ray Mariuz (born December 25, 1980) is a former professional Canadian football linebacker He was drafted 28th overall by the Toronto Argonauts in the 2003 CFL Draft and won a Grey Cup championship in 2004. In 2011, Mariuz retired from professional football.  However, he would come out of retirement later in the 2011 CFL season and finish the season with the Hamilton Tiger-Cats. He played CIS football for the McMaster Marauders.

Mariuz now works as a sales distributor for Conmed Linvatech.

References

External links
Hamilton Tiger-Cats bio

1980 births
Living people
Canadian football linebackers
Canadian people of Polish descent
McMaster Marauders football players
Toronto Argonauts players
Hamilton Tiger-Cats players
Sportspeople from Mississauga
Canadian real estate agents